Antônio Francisco Moura Neto (born 6 August 1996), known as Neto Moura or simply Neto, is a Brazilian footballer who plays as a midfielder for Cruzeiro.

Career statistics

Honours

Sport Recife
 Copa do Nordeste: 2014
 Campeonato Pernambucano: 2014, 2017

América Mineiro
 Campeonato Brasileiro Série B: 2017

Remo
Copa Verde: 2021

References

External links

1996 births
Living people
Sportspeople from Alagoas
Brazilian footballers
Association football midfielders
Campeonato Brasileiro Série A players
Campeonato Brasileiro Série B players
Sport Club do Recife players
América Futebol Clube (MG) players
Vila Nova Futebol Clube players
Mirassol Futebol Clube players
Cruzeiro Esporte Clube players